Richard Pryor: Live on the Sunset Strip is a 1982 American stand-up comedy film directed by Joe Layton. The film stars and produced by Richard Pryor, who also wrote the film with Paul Mooney. The film is released alongside Pryor's album of the same name in 1982, and was the most financially lucrative of the comedian's concert films. The material includes Pryor's frank discussion of his drug addiction and of the night that he caught on fire while freebasing cocaine in 1980.

Cast
 Richard Pryor as himself
 Gene Cross as Stoned Hippie 
 Julie Hampton as herself 
 Jesse Jackson as himself (audience member, uncredited)

Production
The film cost $4.5 million of which $3 million went to Pryor.

Reception
Richard Pryor: Live on the Sunset Strip has received positive reviews. Rotten Tomatoes gives the film a score of 100% based on reviews from 13 critics, with an average rating of 8.8/10.

Writing in Commentary, conservative reviewer Richard Grenier saw Pryor's performance as embodying, and as forcing white audiences to accept and respect, an urban type that was more authentic than that exemplified by other Black comedians:

. . . Pryor, on stage, plays the very caricature of the irresponsible black man, the embodiment of almost every single stereotypical trait that traditionally consigned him to the bottom of the country's social order. But he transcends the character. We have had Stepin Fetchit and Butterfly McQueen playing seemingly bonafide black idiots. We have had Bill Cosby and Dick Gregory "talking white" to white audiences. (We have even had Flip Wilson and Redd Foxx, amiable but insignificant black comics—neither here nor there.) But Richard Pryor for the first time has taken the “black” character at its socially most regressive, and made us laugh in a new way—as if behind this performance is a high intelligence.

The film grossed $36.3 million, the highest-grossing concert film of all-time until surpassed by Eddie Murphy Raw in 1988.

References

External links 
 
 
  Roger Ebert's review

1982 films
1982 comedy films
African-American comedy films
African-American films
American comedy films
Columbia Pictures films
Films with screenplays by Richard Pryor
Richard Pryor
Stand-up comedy concert films
1980s English-language films
1980s American films